Alex Christian Jean Petit  (born May 19, 1995), professionally known as CashMoneyAP, is a French record producer, songwriter and record executive. He is best known for posting "type beats" on video platform YouTube and on beat-selling platform Beatstars.

Early life 
Alex Christian Jean Petit, Sr. was born in Guadelope, France on May 19, 1995. He started making "type beats", which is production in the style of certain popular artists, and posted them on YouTube, where he eventually gained a following. His pseudonym, "CashMoneyAP", originates from the name of the label Cash Money Records and his initials (Alex Petit).

Career 
Petit has produced beats for artists such as Roddy Ricch, Lil Skies, Gucci Mane, and more. Between 2013 and 2014, he started gaining attention in Chicago when he started producing beats for prominent drill rappers such as Fredo Santana, Lil Jay and Famous Dex. He started to gain mainstream attraction after he produced Lil Skies' song "Nowadays", which peaked at number 55 on the Billboard Hot 100.

Other ventures 
Petit founded the record label and production collective Cash Gang in early 2020. Its roster includes record producers Daniel Moras, Layz, Luci G, Palaze, Relly Made, Santo, Tig, Weird Mahdi, SZR, YoungKio and YoungNef. It is a subsidiary of the record label Petit is signed to, Victor Victor Worldwide. Petit is also signed as a producer to Universal Music Publishing Group and as a recording artist to Atlantic Records.

Production discography

Charted songs

Notes

References 

1995 births
Living people
Guadeloupean musicians
French record producers